Summify was a social news aggregator founded by Mircea Paşoi and Cristian Strat, two former Google and Microsoft interns from Romania. The service emailed its users a periodic summary of news articles shared from their social networks based on relevance and importance. The platform supported Twitter, Facebook, and Google Reader accounts. Advisors to Summify include Ryan Holmes, CEO of Hootsuite and Ethan Anderson, CEO of Redbeacon.

History

In 2009, Paşoi and Strat created ReadFu, a plugin that provided a contextual summary and statistics of the target page of a hyperlink. In January 2010, ReadFu was accepted into the Vancouver-based start-up incubator Bootup Labs. On March 20, 2010 the service was renamed as Summify and a private beta began.

On August 11, 2010 Paşoi and Strat announced a new direction for the service. It would become a real-time social news reader that aggregates incoming news from social networks and displays articles by importance using social reactions.

After some feedback that the users preferred article digests by email more than the real-time news reader version, Summify discontinued the news reader version.

Summify released a free app on the Apple App Store July 8, 2011. The app allows users to consume their web summaries from iOS mobile devices.

Summify was acquired by Twitter on January 19, 2012. The service shut down on June 22, 2012.

Investors
In March 2011, Summify completed a seed round of funding from the following investors:

 Rob Glaser, Founder of RealNetworks and Co-founder of SocialEyes
 Accel Partners, represented by Andrew Braccia
 Stewart Butterfield, Co-Founder of Tiny Speck and Flickr
 Steve Olechowski, Co-Founder of FeedBurner
 Boris Wertz, Founder of W Media Ventures, a Vancouver-based angel fund, and COO of AbeBooks
 Michael Edwards,  Co-founder of Sosido Networks
 Brent Holliday, Head of Technology Practice at Capital West Partners
 Jim Fletcher, Managing Director and Co-Founder of Chrysalix Energy Venture Capital

Reception
Summify has been well received by popular websites such as TechCrunch. It has also been featured in Time, The Globe and Mail, Mashable, VentureBeat, Gizmodo, Lifehacker, and The Next Web.

References

External links
 official website
 official blog
 Summify on Twitter
 Summify on Facebook

Online companies of Canada
Internet properties established in 2009
Twitter, Inc. acquisitions
Web applications
2012 mergers and acquisitions